François Mazet (born 24 February 1943 in Paris) is a former racing driver from France.  He participated in only one Formula One World Championship Grand Prix, finished 13th and scored no championship points.

Mazet won the French Formula Three Championship in 1969 with a Tecno, and moved to Formula Two (F2) with the Sports Motor team alongside Tim Schenken for 1970. It was not a successful move and with sponsorship from Shell Petroleum, Mazet raced Jo Siffert's F2 Chevron when Siffert was unavailable as well as touring cars for Ford Germany. The association with Siffert led to Mazet driving the team's March 701 at Paul Ricard in the 1971 French Grand Prix. This however, was his only attempt at Formula One.

After his racing career ended, Mazet was involved in the sponsorship of Lotus by Essex Petroleum in the 1980s.

Complete Formula One World Championship results
(key)

References

1943 births
French racing drivers
French Formula One drivers
Siffert Racing Formula One drivers
European Formula Two Championship drivers
French Formula Three Championship drivers
Living people
Racing drivers from Paris